Manzoor-ul Hassan (born 15 January 1952) is a Pakistani field hockey player. He competed in the men's tournament at the 1976 Summer Olympics at Montreal, Canada and was part of the team that won the bronze medal. 

After his retirement, he also worked as a coach for the Pakistani hockey team.

Awards
Tamgha-i-Imtiaz (Medal of Excellence) by the Government of Pakistan in 1989.

References

External links
 

1952 births
Living people
Pakistani male field hockey players
Olympic field hockey players of Pakistan
Field hockey players at the 1976 Summer Olympics
Olympic bronze medalists for Pakistan
Olympic medalists in field hockey
Medalists at the 1976 Summer Olympics
Place of birth missing (living people)
Asian Games medalists in field hockey
Asian Games gold medalists for Pakistan
Medalists at the 1974 Asian Games
Medalists at the 1978 Asian Games
Medalists at the 1982 Asian Games
Field hockey players at the 1974 Asian Games
Field hockey players at the 1978 Asian Games
Field hockey players at the 1982 Asian Games
Recipients of Tamgha-e-Imtiaz